Wet Glaize is an unincorporated community in Camden County, in the Ozarks of central Missouri. The community is just east of Missouri Route 7 on Mill Creek, which is a tributary of the Wet Glaize Creek. Montreal is to the northwest on Route 7 and Richland is to the southeast. Mill Creek has a large fish hatchery in the vicinity of Wet Glaize.

History
A post office called Wet Glaize was established in 1848, and remained in operation until 1938. The community took its name from nearby Wet Auglaize Creek.

References

Unincorporated communities in Camden County, Missouri
Unincorporated communities in Missouri